Awards and decorations of Ukraine are medals and orders granted by the President of Ukraine for meritorious achievements in national defense, state improvement, and development of democracy and human rights.  Awards may also be issued to military personnel of the Ukrainian Armed Forces and be worn in conjunction with awards and decorations of the Ukrainian military.

The following is a selection of civilian awards which are presently issued by the Ukrainian government.

All recipients qualify for the Special merits to Ukraine status.

Titles

Highest distinction

Honorary title

Orders

Medals

Presidential honors

Honors of the Verkhovna Rada

See also
 Awards of Ukraine

External links
 State awards of Ukraine at the presidential website